Gödel's theorem may refer to any of several theorems developed by the mathematician Kurt Gödel:
Gödel's incompleteness theorems
Gödel's completeness theorem
Gödel's speed-up theorem

See also
 Gödel's ontological proof